Retráctate was the second studio album from the Chilean pop band Supernova.

Track listing
 Herida
 Retráctate
 Barco a vapor
 Se te olvida
 Pocas Palabras
 Nuestra Promesa
 Verano de amor
 Cuando ama una mujer
 Lo confieso... (aún te quiero)
 Juegas con fuego

Singles
 Herida
 Se te olvida
 Pocas Palabras

2002 albums
Supernova (Chilean band) albums